William Victor Hawke (April 28, 1870 – December 11, 1902) was an American Major League Baseball player who pitched for three seasons, all in the National League, with a career record of 32 wins and 31 losses.

Career

He pitched in 14 games that first season, with a 5–5 win–loss record and threw one shutout. Bill split  season between the Browns and the Baltimore Orioles. It was for the latter that he pitched a no-hit, 5-0 victory against the Washington Senators on August 16, 1893. It was the first no-hitter at the new distance from the pitcher's mound to home plate. For the 1893 season, the mound was moved from 50 feet to 60 feet 6 inches, the distance that is still used to this day. Hawke finished his career the following season, with a 16-9 record for the National League champion Baltimore Orioles.

Post-career

On December 11, 1902, he died of carcinoma at the age of 32 in Wilmington, Delaware, and was interred at Wilmington and Brandywine Cemetery in Wilmington.

See also
 List of Major League Baseball no-hitters

References

External links

Triple plays

1870 births
1902 deaths
Major League Baseball pitchers
19th-century baseball players
Baseball players from Delaware
Burials at Wilmington and Brandywine Cemetery
Reading Actives players
Brockton Shoemakers players
Albany Senators players
St. Louis Browns (NL) players
Baltimore Orioles (NL) players
People from New Castle County, Delaware